Galilee Green is a brand of extra-virgin olive oil exported from Israel, made in the Lower Galilee region. The company is based in Yavne'el, and its olive groves are in Kibbutz Degania Alef. Their olive oil is made by cold pressing a blend of the Barnea, Coratina, and Koroneiki varieties of olive.

References

External links

Official Website

Olive oil
Brand name condiments
Israeli brands